Ozren Perić (Serbian Cyrillic: Озрен Перић; born 4 April 1987) is a Bosnian-Herzegovinian footballer who plays for Borac Šamac.

Club career
In July 2017, Perić joined FK Tekstilac Derventa. Two years later, he joined FK Alfa Modriča ahead of the 2019/20 season.

References

External links

1987 births
Living people
People from Gradiška, Bosnia and Herzegovina
Association football forwards
Bosnia and Herzegovina footballers
Bosnia and Herzegovina under-21 international footballers
SK Sturm Graz players
NK Rudar Velenje players
FK Borac Banja Luka players
FK Kozara Gradiška players
FK Laktaši players
HŠK Zrinjski Mostar players
FK Krupa players
FK Tekstilac Derventa players
FK Modriča players
FK Borac Šamac players
Austrian Football Bundesliga players
Slovenian PrvaLiga players
Premier League of Bosnia and Herzegovina players
Bosnia and Herzegovina expatriate footballers
Expatriate footballers in Austria
Bosnia and Herzegovina expatriate sportspeople in Austria
Expatriate footballers in Slovenia
Bosnia and Herzegovina expatriate sportspeople in Slovenia